Horse racing in India is over 200 years old. The first racecourse in the country was set up in Madras in 1777. Today, India has a very well established racing and breeding industry, and the sport is conducted on nine racetracks by six racing authorities.

Racing is restricted to Indian-bred racehorses and India has a well established breeding industry with stallions imported from all over the world.  The Indian Stud Book maintains records of all thoroughbred breeding activity in India.

India have main punters musugu Kiran Kumar and DN kempegowda rule the betting of horseracing. India has a mixture of both pool betting and traditional bookmakers.

Turf clubs

Bangalore Turf Club, conducts racing at Bangalore in two distinct seasons - in summer from May to August and in winter from November to April.
Hyderabad Turf Club, conducts racing in Hyderabad where racing is held on the Monsoon Track from July until the end of October and on the Winter Track from November until February. Hyderabad usually races on Sundays and Mondays. 
Royal Calcutta Turf Club, conducts racing in Kolkata, with a main winter season from November to April and a monsoon season which runs from July until mid October.
Royal Western India Turf Club (RWITC), conducts racing in Mumbai from November to May and Pune from July to November.
The Mysore Race Club conducts racing in Mysuru, is the most picturesque in the country. Set up in the foothills of the imposing Chamundi Hills, the Mysore Race Club has a distinct identity of its own. Mysore, which is an independent Turf Authority conducts regular season between mid-August and the end of October, as well as smaller summer and winter seasons.
Madras Race Club, conducts racing in Chennai home turf of the late turf baron Dr MAM Ramaswamy from October to March and morning races at the picturesque Udhagamandalam (Ooty) Race Course from April to June. 
Delhi Turf Club, established in 1940, which conducts racing at India's capital Delhi usually once a week from August until May, where racing is run under the aegis of RWITC.

All Race Clubs mentioned above conduct their individual set of Classic races.
Classic races include The Derby, The Oaks, The St Leger, The 1000 & 2000 Guineas etc...

Major races
India has five 'Classic' races which parallel the original British classic races. The Indian 1,000 Guineas & the Indian 2,000 Guineas are run in December. Only three-year-old fillies can run the 1,000 Guineas race, while both fillies and colts can run the 2,000 Guineas race. The Indian Oaks is run at the end of January. The Indian Derby is run on the first Sunday of February and carries a purse of over ₹ 30,000,000. Lastly, the Indian St. Leger is run in September. They are all run in the Mahalaxmi Racecourse, Mumbai, apart from the St. Leger which is run at Pune.

The Invitation Weekend which rotates between the various turf authorities is held on the first weekend of March. This features a Group 1 race each for sprinters over 1200 metres, a race over a mile and a 3000-metre race for stayers. The best horses are invited from all over the country for these races. The showpiece event is open to Indian horses which are 4 years old and over, invited from all the turf authorities, and carries a winners prize of ₹ 10,000,000.  The Bangalore Derby is held on the second Sunday of July in the Bangalore Turf Club,Bangalore every year. It was sponsored by Kingfisher until the 2020 season.
The Invitation cup and associated races (i.e The Sprinters'Cup, The Stayers' Cup,  The Super Mile Cup) are rotational between the various race courses spread across the country, is run over 2400 meters ,only the 4years old horses were eligible but from 2014 onwards it has been changed to elder horses also.

Famous horses
Elusive Pimpernel (22 of 23 starts) and Squanderer (18 of 19 starts) are considered the greatest horses to have raced on Indian Turf. Both horses were trained by Rashid Byramji.

Indian Racing have witnessed champion horses in the recent history in the name of Desert God, Quasar, Alaindair, Be Safe, In the Spotlight etc...While Desert God(Burden Of Proof - Running Flame By Steinbeck) is the highest stakes earner of Indian Racing till date , In the Spotlight(Alnasr Alwasheek - Radiate) is the highest stakes earning filly in Indian Racing till date. Both trained by multiple Classic winning trainer Mr. S Padmanabhan. Desert God is also the highest Black type winner in India. In fact, Desert God was owned & bred by Mr. S Padmanabhan.

Indian horses have made their mark on the international scene. Mystical(Alnasr Alwasheek - Mystic Memory) won two races at the Dubai Racing Carnival.  Saddle Up was the best horse in training on the Malayasia/Singapore circuit and won the Tunku Gold Cup as well as running second in the Singapore International Cup.  Others to perform well have been Southern Regent, who won twice in England when way past his prime at the age of 9. Beat It Dude was one of the highest rated horses in South Korea in 2008.  Astonish was a Class 1 winner in Hong Kong.  Quarantine restrictions and apathy on the part of the Indian Government have kept these opportunities to race abroad very minimal. Own opinion who represented India in the Japan cup in 1980 as 7 old and although he finished 13th he beat his own record despite the race track being anti-clockwise

Famous trainers

Famous trainers over the years have been; Rashid Byramji, S.S.Attaollahi, J S Dhariwal, Pesi Shroff, S.M. Shah, S Padmanabhan, Imtiaz Sait, Dallas Todywalla, S Ganapathy, Madhav Mangalorkar, Arjun Mangalorkar, Vijay Singh, LVR Deshmukh, James Mckeown, Darius Byramji, S.S. Shah, Vinayak, D. Adenwala, ALJ Talib, A.B. David, Haskell David, Lawrence Fownes, Prasanna Kumar, Bezan Chenoy

Famous jockeys

Famous Indian jockeys include Pesi Shroff, Vasant Shinde, Pandu Khade, Shamu Chavan, Kheem Singh, Aslam Kader, B Prakash, Sinclair Marshall, Robin Corner, Warren Singh, C Rajendra, Lloyd Marshall, Mohammed Dastagir(chinna), M Narredu, Richard Alford, E Alford, C Alford, B Sreekanth, K P G Appu, Suraj Narredu, P S Chouhan, A Sandesh, Trevor Patel, Akshay Kumar, S.John, C.S.Jodha Y S Srinath, Karl Umrigar During the winter season, many foreign jockeys also come to India. In recent years this has included the likes of David Allan, Sandy Barclay, Christophe Lemaire, Johnny Murtagh, Seamus Heffernan, Jim Crowley, Frankie Dettori, Pat Eddery, Richard Hughes, Stéphane Pasquier, Martin Dwyer, Colm O'Donoghue, Joseph O'Brien, Chris Hayes, Lester Piggott, Johnny Murtagh, Joe Mercer, Mick Kinane, Walter Swinburn, David Egan, Leigh Roche, Nicky Mackay and numerous others have ridden in India.

Famous owners 
Prominent owners over the years include; HH Maharaja Sir Harisinghji of Kashmir, HH Maharaja Jiwajirao Scindia, Vijayasinhji Chhatrasinhji, M. A. M. Ramaswamy, Vijay Mallya, Suresh Mahindra, Major PK Mehra, Marthand Mahindra, The Thomas Family (AV Thomas Group), The Brar family of Muktsar, The Goculdas Family, Ranjit V. Bhat, The Khaitan Family (McNeil & Magor Group), The Poonawalla Family, KN Dhunjibhoy, Shapoor Mistry, Vijay Shirke, Ameeta Mehra, S Rangarajan, Sunit Khatau of the Khatau family.

Horse racing gambling in India 
The process of betting is heavily prohibited in India, except for online betting at sites that are based outside of India (known as "offshore sites") and allow players to deposit and withdraw Indian rupees. However, horse racing and lotteries are legal in both land-based and online betting houses. The Supreme Court in the case of Dr. KR Lakshmanan v. State of Tamil Nadu (AIR 1996 SC 1153), stated that horse racing is not based on luck alone but it is also based on skills. Several states have enacted statutes that specifically allow licensed bookmakers. Currently betting is low key after the GST regime came into being as it is heavily taxed by the Indian Govt. This has led to the sport suffering heavy loss of revenue

References

External links
India Race India's first & formest horse racing portal
Equine India
Racing World India - India's Only Equestrian Magazine